Cuylerville is a village in South Africa, located halfway between Bathurst and the Great Fish River. It was the first village established by the 1820 settlers, and was named after Colonel Jacob Glen Cuyler, the military commander at Fort Frederick.

See also 
 List of heritage sites in Eastern Cape

References

External links 
 St Mary's Church Cuylerville

Populated places in the Ndlambe Local Municipality
Populated places established in 1820
Cuyler family